Brookline   is a town in Norfolk County, Massachusetts, in the United States, and part of the Boston metropolitan area. Brookline borders six of Boston's neighborhoods: Brighton, Allston, Fenway–Kenmore, Mission Hill, Jamaica Plain, and West Roxbury. The city of Newton lies to the west of Brookline. Brookline was first settled in 1638 as a hamlet in Boston, known as Muddy River; it was incorporated as a separate town in 1705.

At the time of the 2020 United States Census, the population of the town was 63,191. It has been the most populous municipality in Massachusetts to have a town (rather than city) form of government since Framingham changed to a city in 2018 following a 2017 referendum.

History

Once part of Algonquian territory, Brookline was first settled by European colonists in the early 17th century. The area was an outlying part of the colonial settlement of Boston and known as the hamlet of Muddy River. In 1705, it was incorporated as the independent town of Brookline. The northern and southern borders of the town were marked by two small rivers or brooks, which is the town's namesake. The northern border with Brighton (which was itself part of Cambridge until 1807) was Smelt Brook. (That name appears on maps starting at least as early as 1852, but sometime between 1888 and 1925 the brook was covered over.) The southern boundary, abutting Boston, was the Muddy River.

In 1843, deeds in Brookline forbade resale of property to "any negro or native of Ireland."

The Town of Brighton was merged with Boston in 1874, and the Boston-Brookline border was redrawn to connect the new Back Bay neighborhood with Allston-Brighton. This merger created a narrow strip of land along the Charles River belonging to Boston, cutting Brookline off from the shoreline. It also put certain lands north of the Muddy River on the Boston side, including what are now Kenmore Square and Packard's Corner. The current northern border follows Commonwealth Avenue, and on the northeast, St. Mary's Street. When Frederick Law Olmsted designed the Emerald Necklace of parks and parkways for Boston in the 1890s, the Muddy River was integrated into the Riverway and Olmsted Park, creating parkland accessible by both Boston and Brookline residents.

Throughout its history, Brookline has resisted being annexed by Boston, in particular during the Boston–Brookline annexation debate of 1873. The neighboring towns of West Roxbury and Hyde Park connected Brookline to the rest of Norfolk County until they were annexed by Boston in 1874 and 1912, respectively, putting them in Suffolk County. Brookline is now separated from the remainder of Norfolk County.

Brookline has long been regarded as a pleasant and verdant environment. In the 1841 edition of the Theory and Practice of Landscape Gardening, Andrew Jackson Downing described the area this way:

Brookline residents were among the first in the country to propose extending the vote to women. Benjamin F. Butler, in his 1882 campaign for Governor, advocated the idea.

Transportation history
Two branches of upper Boston Post Road, established in the 1670s, passed through Brookline. Brookline Village was the original center of retail activity. In 1810, the Boston and Worcester Turnpike, now Massachusetts Route 9, was laid out, starting on Huntington Avenue in Boston and passing through the village center on its way west.

Steam railroads came to Brookline in the middle of the 19th century. The Boston and Worcester Railroad was constructed in the early 1830s, and passed through Brookline near the Charles River. The rail line is still in active use, now paralleled by the Massachusetts Turnpike. The Highland branch of the Boston and Albany Railroad was built from Kenmore Square to Brookline Village in 1847, and was extended into Newton in 1852. In the late 1950s, this would become the Green Line D branch.

The portion of Beacon Street west of Kenmore Square was laid out in 1850.  Streetcar tracks were laid above ground on Beacon Street in 1888, from Coolidge Corner to Massachusetts Avenue in Boston, via Kenmore Square. In 1889, they were electrified and extended over the Brighton border at Cleveland Circle. They would eventually become the Green Line C branch.

Thanks to the Boston Elevated Railway system, this upgrade from horse-drawn carriage to electric trolleys occurred on many major streets all over the region, and made transportation into downtown Boston faster and cheaper. Much of Brookline was developed into a streetcar suburb, with large brick apartment buildings sprouting up along the new streetcar lines.

Etymology
Brookline was known as the hamlet of Muddy River and was considered part of Boston until the Town of Brookline was independently incorporated in 1705.  (The Muddy River was used as the Brookline–Boston border at incorporation.) It is said that the name derives from a farm therein once owned by Judge Samuel Sewall. Originally the property of  CPT John Hull and Judith Quincy Hull. Judge Sewall came into possession of this tract, which embraced more than 350 acres, through Hannah Quincy Hull (Sewall) who was the Hull's only daughter. John Hull in his youth lived in Muddy River Hamlet, in a little house which stood near the Sears Memorial Church. Hull removed to Boston, where he amassed a large fortune for those days. Judge Sewall probably never lived on his Brookline estate.

Geography

The northern part of Brookline, roughly north of the D-line tracks, is urban in character, as highly walkable and transit rich. The overall density of Brookline, which also includes suburban districts and grand estates south of the D-line, is still higher than that of many of the largest cities in the United States, especially in the South and West. Brookline borders Newton (part of Middlesex County) to the west and Boston (part of Suffolk County) in all other directions; it is therefore non-contiguous with any other part of Norfolk County. Brookline became an exclave of Norfolk County in 1873, when the neighboring town of West Roxbury was annexed by Boston (and left Norfolk County to join Suffolk County). Brookline refused to be annexed by Boston after the Boston–Brookline annexation debate of 1873.

Brookline separates the bulk of the city of Boston (except for a narrow neck or corridor near the Charles River) from its westernmost neighborhoods of Allston–Brighton, which had been the separate town of Brighton until annexed by Boston in 1873.

Neighborhoods

There are many neighborhood associations, some of which overlap.

Neighborhoods, squares, and notable areas of Brookline include:

 Aspinwall Hill
 Beaconsfield
 Brookline Hills
 Brookline Village
 Buttonwood Village
 Brookline High School, Near Pierce District
 Chestnut Hill, which also extends into Newton and Boston
 Coolidge Corner
 Corey Farm
 Corey Hill
 Cottage Farm
 Fisher Hill
 Griggs Park
 JFK Crossing
 Longwood
 North Brookline
 Pill Hill (also known as "High Street Hill")
 The Point (originally "Whiskey Point")
 The Runkle District
 South Brookline ("Sobro")
 The Heights (just west of Washington Square)
 Washington Square
 Woodland Heath

Climate
The climate of Brookline is humid continental Dfa.

Brookline falls under the USDA 6b Plant Hardiness zone.

Demographics

As of the census of 2010, there were 58,732 people, 24,891 households, and 12,233 families residing in the town. The racial makeup of the town was 73.3% White, 3.4% Black or African American, 0.12% Native American, 15.6% Asian (6.7% Chinese, 2.6% Indian, 2.3% Korean, 1.8% Japanese), 0.03% Pacific Islander, 1.01% from other races, and 3.0% from two or more races. Hispanic or Latino of any race were 5.0% of the population (0.9% Mexican, 0.8% Puerto Rican). (Source: 2010 Census Quickfacts)

There were 25,594 households, out of which 21.9% had children under the age of 18, living with them, 38.4% were married couples living together, 7.1% had a female householder with no husband present, and 52.2% were non-families. 36.7% of all households were made up of individuals, and 10.1% had someone living alone who was 65 years of age or older. The average household size was 2.18 and the average family size was 2.86.

In the town, the population distribution was wide, with 16.6% under the age of 18, 11.7%, from 18 to 24, 37.3% from 25 to 44, 21.9% from 45 to 64, and 12.4% who were 65 years of age or older. The median age was 34 years. For every 100 females, there were 82.6 males. For every 100 females age 18 and over, there were 79.1 males.

The median income for a household in the town was $66,711, and the median income for a family was $92,993. Males had a median income of $56,861 versus $43,436 for females. The per capita income for the town was $44,327.  About 4.5% of families and 9.3% of the population were below the poverty line, including 5.3% of those under the age of 18 and 7.5% of those ages 65 and older. The poverty rate of Brookline’s residents rate rose from 9.3% in 2000 to 13.1% in 2010.

Serving as a residential zone for nearby academic and medical institutes such as Harvard Medical School and Boston University, Brookline was reported as the town with the most doctoral degree holders (14.0% of the total population in 2012) in the United States.

Arts and culture
 Brookline, along with the nearby Boston neighborhood of Brighton and the city of Newton, is a cultural hub for the Jewish community of Greater Boston.
 The Greek Orthodox Archdiocese of America Metropolis of Boston is headquartered in Brookline.
 Brookline Village is home to Puppet Showplace Theater, New England's only dedicated puppet theater and center for puppetry arts. The theater is located in the historic 32 Station Street building directly across from the Brookline Village MBTA Green Line stop.
 There have been three Poet Laureates of Brookline: Judith Steinbergh, Jan Schreiber, and, currently, Zvi Sesling.
 Along with Boston and Quincy, it has a large Irish American presence.

Points of interest

The following historic buildings are open to the public:
 The birthplace of John F. Kennedy stands in Brookline and is listed in the National Register of Historic Places. It is maintained by the National Park Service and is open to the public from May through September.
 John Goddard House, an historic house at 235 Goddard Avenue, was built in 1767 and added to the National Register of Historic Places in 1985.
 Larz Anderson Park is in Brookline on the  estate once owned by Larz Anderson and Isabel Weld Perkins. The park contains the Larz Anderson Auto Museum, the oldest automobile collection in the country, as well as Putterham School, a one-room schoolhouse from colonial times.

Other historic and cultural sites include:
 St. Aidan's Church was where John F. Kennedy was baptized and where the Kennedy family and other prominent Irish-Americans were parishioners. The church was designed by architect Charles Maginnis, who was awarded the American Institute of Architects' gold medal. Although it is listed on the National Register of Historic Places, St. Aidan's Church has been closed and converted into housing.
 The Dutch House, one of only five surviving buildings from the World's Columbian Exposition of 1893 was relocated to Brookline.
 There were two stops on the Underground Railroad in Brookline: 9 Toxteth Street and 182 Walnut Street.
 The Country Club, an exclusive sporting club in the town, was the first private club in the United States formed exclusively for outdoor activities. It is most famous as a golf club; it was one of the five clubs that formed what is now the United States Golf Association and has hosted the U.S. Open three times and the Ryder Cup Matches once.
 Coolidge Corner, which is located at the crossing of Beacon Street and Harvard Street, is one of Brookline's two primary retail districts (the other being Washington Square). It includes a number of historically significant sites, including the S.S. Pierce Building, and the Coolidge Corner Theatre.
 Brookline is home to part of Frederick Law Olmsted's Emerald Necklace of park systems, including Olmsted Park.
 The Puppet Showplace Theatre, one of the four oldest puppet theatres in the United States, is located in Brookline Village.

Government
Brookline is governed by a representative (elected) town meeting, which is the legislative body of the town, and a five-person Select Board that serves as the executive branch of the town.

New and existing laws
In 2017, a Brookline Town Meeting voted to recognize Indigenous People's Day instead of Columbus Day.

In 2019, Brookline banned the distribution of carry out plastic bags at grocery stores and other places of business.

In 2021, Brookline became the first town in America to ban the sale of all tobacco products and electronic and vaping cigarettes to young people born after January 1, 2000. Flavored tobacco products have been banned also.  Vendors and small business owners have filed a lawsuit against the town, citing a loss of business and an inability to hire new employees in the near future.

Education

Public schools

The town is served by the Public Schools of Brookline. The student body at Brookline High School includes students from more than 76 countries. Many students attend Brookline High from surrounding neighborhoods in Boston, such as Mission Hill and Mattapan through the Metropolitan Council for Educational Opportunity (METCO) system.

There are eight elementary schools in the Brookline Public School system: Baker School, Coolidge Corner School, Driscoll, Heath, Lawrence, Lincoln, Pierce, and Runkle. As of December 2006, there were 6,089 K–12 students enrolled in the Brookline public schools. The system includes one early learning center, eight grades K–8 schools, and one comprehensive high school. The Old Lincoln School is a surplus building used by the town to temporarily teach students in when another school building is being renovated. It was rented in 2009 as the venue for the play Sleep No More.

As of the 2012-13 school year, the student body was 57.4% White, 18.1% Asian, 6.4% Black, 9.9% Hispanic, and 8.2% multi-race. Approximately 30% of students came from homes where English is not the first language.

Private schools

Several private primary and secondary schools are located in Brookline.
 Beaver Country Day School
 Brimmer and May School – partly in Newton
 Dexter Southfield School
 Ivy Street School
 Maimonides School
 The Park School
 Saint Mary of the Assumption School
 Mount Alvernia Academy (Chestnut Hill)

Higher education

Several institutes of higher education are located in Brookline.

 Pine Manor College
 Hellenic College & Holy Cross Greek Orthodox School of Theology
 Boston Graduate School of Psychoanalysis

Also, parts of the following are located in Brookline: Boston University including Wheelock College, Boston College, and Northeastern University's Parsons Field.

Newbury College closed in 2019.

Infrastructure

Transportation

Light rail and subway
Brookline is served by the C and D branches of the MBTA's Green Line trains, with inbound service to downtown Boston and outbound service to Newton. The B line runs along the town's northern border of Commonwealth Avenue in Allston.

Bus
Brookline is served by several MBTA bus routes.

Public libraries
 Public Library of Brookline, 361 Washington St., Brookline, MA 02445
 Coolidge Corner Branch Library, 31 Pleasant St., Brookline, MA 02446
 Putterham Branch Library, 959 West Roxbury Pkwy., Chestnut Hill, MA 02467

Fire department
The town of Brookline is protected full-time by the 158 paid, professional firefighters of the Brookline Fire Department (BFD). It currently operates out of five fire stations located throughout the town, under the command of a Deputy Chief per shift. The BFD also operates a fire apparatus fleet of four engines, two ladders, one quint, one cross-staffed rescue (special operations), two squads, one special operations unit, one haz-mat decon trailer, two maintenance units, as well as numerous other special, support, and reserve units. The Brookline Fire Department responds to approximately 8,500 emergency calls annually. The current Chief of Department is John F. Sullivan.

Cemeteries

 The Old Burying Ground, also known as Walnut Street Cemetery. 1717 – 1.54 acres (Walnut Street at Chestnut Street)
 Walnut Hills Cemetery 1875 – 45.26 acres (Grove Street and Allandale Road)

Notable people

 Jeff Adrien (born 1986), University of Connecticut Huskies basketball captain and power forward
 Bhumibol Adulyadej, His Majesty King Bhumibol Adulyadej (King Rama IX) of Thailand lived his infancy in Brookline while his father the prince studied at Harvard Medical School
 Eddie Andelman, sports radio host and businessman, moved to Brookline as child, graduated from Brookline High
 Larz Anderson, U.S. Ambassador to Japan
 Ray Atherton, first U.S. Ambassador to Canada, born and raised in Brookline
 Lily Batchelder, professor at New York University. She was the former chief tax counsel to the U.S. Senate Finance Committee under the Obama administration and appointed to head Joe Biden's IRS transition team
 Linda Barnes, novelist
 Saul Bellow, Nobel Prize-winning novelist, lived the last 12 years of his life in Brookline
 Larry Bird, professional basketball player, lived in Brookline while he played for the Boston Celtics
 Ran Blake, jazz pianist and composer
 Michael Bloomberg, Mayor of New York City 2002–2012, lived in Brookline as a child
 Marita Bonner (1899–1971), writer, essayist, and playwright
 Zabdiel Boylston, physician who introduced inoculation against smallpox to the North American colonies in 1721
 Tom Brady, lived in Brookline while quarterback of the New England Patriots
 Gisele Bündchen, supermodel and former wife of Tom Brady
 Richard Burgin, author, editor of Boulevard (magazine)
 Michael A. Burstein, science-fiction writer
 Stanley Cavell (born 1926), professor of philosophy, winner of a MacArthur Fellowship]
 Gene Clapp (born 1949), silver medalist 1972 Summer Olympics
 Herman Chernoff (born 1923), statistician
 Ida Conquest, actress
 Zach Cone, creator and player of Biker Boy
 Harvey Cushing, "father of modern neurosurgery"
 Thomas Aspinwall Davis (1798–1845), businessman and mayor of Boston
 Michael Dukakis (born 1933), former Governor of Massachusetts and 1988 Democratic Presidential candidate
 Adam Edelman (born 1991), American-born four-time Israeli National Champion in skeleton event, and Israeli Olympian
 Theo Epstein (born 1973), Chicago Cubs President of Baseball Operations and former Boston Red Sox general manager
 Hank Eskin, webmaster of Where's George?
 Alice Ettinger, radiologist 
 Frederick Perry Fish (1855–1930), pioneering intellectual property attorney
 Kenny Florian, professional mixed martial artist
 Terry Francona, manager of the Cleveland Guardians
 David Frankel, venture capitalist and entrepreneur 
 Edward Fredkin, digital physics pioneer, inventor of the trie data structure, the Fredkin gate and the Billiard-Ball Computer Model for reversible computing
 Fayette F. Forbes (1851–1935), water engineer, plant collector, and botanist with a particular interest in algae and diatoms
 Irwin Freedberg, dermatologist
 Raffi Freedman-Gurspan, LGBTQ activist and first openly transgender White House staffer 
 Peter Gammons, baseball writer and ESPN commentator
 King Gillette, popularizer of the safety razor
 Sheldon Glashow (born 1932), Nobel Prize-winning physicist
 Robert R. Glauber, Harvard faculty, former Chairman of NASD
 Robert Goldwyn (1930–2010), editor-in-chief of Plastic and Reconstructive Surgery for 25 years, Professor of Surgery at Harvard Medical School, and Chief of Plastic Surgery at Beth Israel Hospital
 Ellen Goodman (born 1941), American journalist and Pulitzer Prize-winning syndicated columnist
 Minnie Goodnow (1871–1952), WWI nurse and nurse educator
 Roland Hayes (1887–1977), lyric tenor and composer
 John Hodgman (born 1971), author and contributor for This American Life and The Daily Show
 Sybil Holmes (1889–1979), first female member of the Massachusetts Senate
 Levi Yitzchak Horowitz (1921–2009), the Bostoner Rebbe
 Isabella Howland (1895–1974), painter and sculptor
 Peter Ivers (1946–1983), musician, singer, songwriter, and television personality 
 Richard Jones, US ambassador to Israel, lived in Brookline with his family
 Victor Kac (born 1943), mathematician, MIT faculty, creator of Kac-Moody algebras, creator of Superalgebra
 Jeffrey Karp, biomedical researcher
 John F. Kennedy (1917–1963), 35th President of the United States (1961–63), born and lived first 10 years of his life in Brookline
 Rosemary Kennedy (1918–2005), sister of President John F. Kennedy, born in Brookline
 Kathleen Agnes Kennedy (Kathleen Cavendish, Marchioness of Hartington) (1920–1948), sister of President John F. Kennedy, born in Brookline
 Eunice Kennedy Shriver (1921–2009), sister of President John F. Kennedy, born in Brookline
 Patricia Kennedy Lawford (1924–2006), sister of President John F. Kennedy, born in Brookline
 Robert F. Kennedy (1925–1968), Attorney General, US Senator, brother of President John F. Kennedy, born in Brookline
 Louise Andrews Kent (1886–1969), author
 Robert Kraft (born 1941), New England Patriots owner
 Jon Krakauer (born 1954, raised in Corvallis, Oregon), author of Into the Wild and Into Thin Air, columnist for Outside magazine
 Louis Krasner (1903–1995), American violinist 
 Michio, leader of the worldwide macrobiotic movement
 Amos Adams Lawrence (1814–1886), merchant and abolitionist
 Abbott Lawrence Lowell (1856–1943), former president of Harvard University
 Lester Lefton, president of Kent State University
 Tony Levin (born 1946), musician
 Amy Lowell (1874–1925), poet
 Eddie Lowery (1903–1984), 10-year-old caddie of Francis Ouimet during 1913 U.S. Open held in Brookline
 Larry Lucchino (born 1945), co-owner of Boston Red Sox
 Ananda Mahidol, His Majesty King Ananda Mahidol (King Rama VIII) of Thailand, lived during age 1–3 years in Brookline while his father the prince studied at Harvard Medical School
 Albert and David Maysles, documentary filmmakers
 Arthur Chute McGill (1926–1980), theologian, philosopher, author and editor, Harvard professor 1971–1980
 Joey McIntyre, youngest member of musical group New Kids on the Block, lived in Brookline
 Henry J. Meade, Chief of Chaplains of the U.S. Air Force
 Jean Baker Miller (1927–2006), psychoanalyst, feminist, author, social activist
 Roger Miller, rock musician
 George Minot (1885–1950), winner of the 1934 Nobel Prize in Physiology or Medicine
 Marvin Minsky (1927–2016), Artificial Intelligence theorist, inventor, author, professor
 Abelardo Morell (born 1948), photographer, professor at Massachusetts College of Art
 William Murphy (1892–1987), winner of 1934 Nobel Prize in Physiology or Medicine
 Nicholas Nixon, photographer, professor at Massachusetts College of Art
 Joel Mark Noe (1943–1991), pioneering reconstructive plastic surgeon, longtime resident
 Conan O'Brien (born 1963), television host, comedian, writer, producer
 Frederick Law Olmsted (1822–1903), landscape architect
 Francis Ouimet (1893–1967), amateur golfer who won the U.S. Open in 1913
 Edith Pearlman (born 1936), short story writer
 Paul Pender (1930–2003), boxer, middleweight champion
 Esther Petrack, contestant on America's Next Top Model, Cycle 15
 Henry Varnum Poor, creator of the Standard & Poor's Index
 Alfredo Quiñones-Hinojosa, M.D., neurosurgeon and author
 Norman Ramsey (1915–2011), winner of the 1989 Nobel Prize in Physics
 Rishi Reddi, short story writer
 Elliot Richardson, lieutenant governor and attorney general of Massachusetts, cabinet official in the Nixon and Ford administrations, ambassador and lawyer
 Florida Ruffin Ridley (1861–1943), civil rights activist, suffragist, teacher, writer, and editor
 Steve Rochinski (born 1954), jazz guitarist, recording artist, composer, arranger, author, jazz educator
 John Rock (1890–1984), pioneer in the development of in vitro fertilization and the birth control pill
 Neil Rolde (born 1932), writer and Maine politician
 David L. Rose (born 1967), tech entrepreneur and scientist at the MIT Media Lab
 Dan Rosenthal (born 1966), Assistant to the President in White House under Bill Clinton
 Larry Ruttman (born 1931), attorney and author
 Arnold Schoenberg (1874–1951), composer, lived at 1280 Beacon Street during the 1930s
 Samuel Sewall (1652–1730), judge in the Salem witch trials
 Charles Sprague Sargent (1841–1927), first director of Harvard University's Arnold Arboretum
 Conrad Salinger (1901–1962), longtime orchestrator for MGM musicals
 Sarah Schechter (born 1976), film and television producer 
 Joseph B. Soloveitchik (1903–1993), Jewish scholar
 Sarah Smith (born 1947), novelist
 Lawrence Summers, economist, president of Harvard University 2001–2006
 Cindy Stumpo, entrepreneur and residential contractor featured in numerous national publications
 David Susskind, (1920-1987), producer of TV, movies, and stage plays; TV talk show host.
 Paul Szep (born 1941), two-time Pulitzer Prize-winning political cartoonist
Karen Tarlow (born 1947), composer 
 James Taylor, musician, owns a home in Brookline
 Michelle Thomas (1968–1998), actress who played Justine Phillips on The Cosby Show and Myra Monkhouse on Family Matters
 Mike Wallace (1918–2012), TV journalist, best known for 60 Minutes
 Stephen Walt, Professor of International Relations, Harvard University
 Barbara Walters (1929–2022), television commentator and journalist
 Robert Weinberg, cancer researcher known for discovering a gene that causes normal cells to form tumors, and the first tumor suppressor gene
 David Weinberger, blogger, internet expert, and political consultant
 William A. Wellman (born 1896 in Brookline), director of Wings (1927)
 Mikey Welsh, former bassist for rock band Weezer, moved to Brookline in his youth
 Henry Melville Whitney (1839–1923), businessman and developer of the Beacon Street boulevard
 James Scollay Whitney (1811–1878), businessman and politician
 John Woodrow Wilson (1922–2015), lithographer, sculptor, painter, muralist, and art teacher
Bob Woolf (1929-1993), Sports agent who represented athletes including Larry Bird, Carl Yastrzemski, John Havlicek and others
 Gary K. Wolf, author, creator of Roger Rabbit
 Danny Yamashiro, chaplain at Massachusetts Institute of Technology, researcher on American presidents and childhood trauma, and media host
 Moshe Yanai, electrical engineer and entrepreneur

In popular culture

In film
 Scenes from American Hustle (2013) were filmed in Brookline.
 Scenes from The Next Karate Kid (1993) were filmed in Brookline.

In television
 June Osborne / Offred, the protagonist of The Handmaid's Tale (2017–present), is from Brookline.

Sister cities
Brookline is twinned with:
  Quezalguaque, Nicaragua (since 1987)
Also included under the two sister cities for the Commonwealth of Massachusetts, Hokkaidō, Japan (since 1990). Basel-Stadt, Switzerland.

See also
 Greater Boston
 European beech in the Longwood Mall
 Metropolitan area
 National Register of Historic Places listings in Brookline, Massachusetts
 Representative town meeting format

References

Further reading
 Ronald Dale Karr. Between City and Country: Brookline, Massachusetts, and the Origins of Suburbia. (Amherst, MA: University of Massachusetts Press, 2018).
 Keith N. Morgan, Elizabeth Hope Cushing, and Roger G. Reed. Community by Design: The Olmsted Firm and the Development of Brookline, Massachusetts  (Amherst, MA: University of Massachusetts Press, 2012).
 Larry Ruttman. Voices of Brookine Foreword by Michael Dukakis. (Portsmouth, New Hampshire: Peter E. Randall Publisher LLC, 2005).

External links

 

 
1638 establishments in Massachusetts
Greek-American culture in Massachusetts
Israeli-American history
Jewish communities in the United States
Jews and Judaism in Massachusetts
Populated places established in 1638
Populated places on the Underground Railroad
Russian communities in the United States
Russian-American culture in Massachusetts
Streetcar suburbs
Towns in Massachusetts
Towns in Norfolk County, Massachusetts
Ukrainian communities in the United States